The Cedar District Formation is a geologic formation exposed on Vancouver Island, the Gulf Islands of British Columbia and San Juan Islands of Washington (state). It preserves fossils dating back to the Campanian Epoch of the Cretaceous period. It dates to the lower mid-Campanian.

Paleobiology

Flora
Suciacarpa starrii

Fauna

Baculites rex
Baculites anceps
Baculites occidentalis
Baculites inornatus
Anapachydiscus nelchinensis
Metaplacenticeras sp.
Canadoceras newberryanum
Pachydiscus neevesi
Hoplitoplacenticeras vancouverense
Gaudryceras denmanense
Neophylloceras sp.
Condonella suciensis 
Ornithomimidae indet.
Theropoda indet. (possibly Tyrannosauridae)

See also

 List of fossiliferous stratigraphic units in Washington (state)
 Paleontology in Washington (state)

References

 

Cretaceous geology of Washington (state)